Marko Pantelić (born 15 September 1978) is a retired Serbian footballer who played as a striker. He represented Serbia at the 2010 FIFA World Cup.

Club career

Early years
As Pantelić was coming up through the Red Star Belgrade youth system, his father got a job in Thessaloniki and took the family to Greece. Pantelić was still only 16 years old when he signed a professional contract with Iraklis Thessaloniki. At 18, he accepted an offer in France to play for Paris Saint-Germain and soon found himself training and playing alongside stars like Raí, Marco Simone and Leonardo. Finding playing time at PSG in short supply, he moved on to Lausanne for a season, scoring 8 goals in 21 Swiss league matches.

Next stop was an unsuccessful spell in Spain at Celta Vigo. During this time, he was sent out on loan to Sturm Graz in Austria.

Obilić, Smederevo and Red Star
In the summer of 2002, after a two-year absence from professional football, Pantelić returned home to Serbia, and signed with Obilić. Barely 24 years of age, he was essentially starting over as many were quick to write him off as yet another prospect whose career was derailed by going abroad too soon. In January 2003 he moved to Sartid Smederevo.

After settling in, he quickly established himself as the team's leader, spearheading them to the Serbia and Montenegro Cup title in 2003. Glowing performances in Smederevo did not go unnoticed by Red Star, and in January 2004, Pantelić became their biggest mid-season signing.

Hertha BSC

After securing a loan move to Hertha for €250,000 on 31 August 2005, the last day of the transfer window, he went on to score 11 goals in 28 league matches during the 2005–06 season. In April 2006, he permanently moved to Hertha for an additional €1.5 million fee and soon established himself as one of the most formidable strikers in the Hertha squad.

Right after getting signed permanently, he responded with an even better season with 14 goals from 32 matches in the 2006–07 season. The 2007–08 season brought more steady play with 13 goals from 28 league matches. The next season, Pantelic was often benched in favor of Andriy Voronin as Hertha contended for the Bundesliga title.  Hertha fell short, finishing in 4th place.

On 17 March 2009, Pantelić denied that he had held talks with any other clubs and coupled with his refusal to sign a new contract with the club, he became a free agent during the summer 2009.

Ajax
On 1 September 2009, after completing several medical tests, Pantelić signed a one-year contract with Dutch side Ajax, and was given the number 9 shirt. During the season, Pantelić scored 16 goals and delivered 9 assists in 25 league matches. Following the season, Pantelić expressed his desire to sign a new contract with Ajax, preferably a multi-year deal, however Ajax preferred a one-year deal. Pantelić did not accept the Ajax offer of a one-year deal with an option of another, because he wanted a sure future for his family. Ajax signed Mounir El Hamdaoui as his successor.

Olympiacos
On 21 August 2010, Pantelić joined Olympiacos on a free transfer. He signed a two-year contract worth €1.6 million per year. He scored his first goal against Panserraikos. On 11 December 2011, Pantelić managed to score four goals and to secure a victory against Kerkyra.

International career
Though he debuted for the national team in 2003, Pantelić started getting more frequent call-ups only in 2006 when he was almost 28 years of age. 

In June 2010, he was selected in Serbia's squad for the 2010 FIFA World Cup,  where he appeared in group stage matches against Ghana and Australia. He scored his first World Cup goal against Australia in a 2–1 loss.

Pantelić also scored three goals in the UEFA Euro 2012 qualifiers. He has not featured for his country since the failed UEFA Euro 2012 campaign.

Outside football

Pantelić is widely known in his home country for his alter ego "Pantela", which was created when an anonymous editor of Kurir allegedly began writing columns under the nickname "Pantela" to reflect the real Pantelić's wit and charisma. The phenomenon became so popular that anonymous fans created profiles on Twitter and Facebook to mimic Pantelić's humorous personality. Pantelić himself confirmed that he is not the owner of either profiles, but admitted to Kurir that he found his alter egos funny and claimed that he would even want to meet the people behind his social networking profiles.

Career statistics

Club
Source:

International

Honours

Club
Lausanne
 Swiss Cup: 1998–99

Sartid Smederevo
 Serbia and Montenegro Cup: 2002–03

Red Star Belgrade
 First League of Serbia and Montenegro: 2003–04
 Serbia and Montenegro Cup: 2003–04

Hertha BSC
 UEFA Intertoto Cup: 2006

Ajax
 KNVB Cup: 2009–10

Olympiacos
 Super League Greece: 2010–11, 2011–12, 2012–13
 Greek Cup: 2011–12, 2012–13

Individual
 Best Sportsman of SD Crvena Zvezda: 2004
 First League of Serbia and Montenegro Top Scorer: 2004–05
Greek Cup Top Goalscorer: 2011–12 (6 goals)

References

External links

 
 
 

1978 births
Living people
Footballers from Belgrade
Serbian footballers
Serbia and Montenegro footballers
Association football forwards
Serbia international footballers
Serbia and Montenegro international footballers
Serbia and Montenegro under-21 international footballers
Iraklis Thessaloniki F.C. players
Paris Saint-Germain F.C. players
FC Lausanne-Sport players
RC Celta de Vigo players
SK Sturm Graz players
Yverdon-Sport FC players
FK Obilić players
FK Smederevo players
Red Star Belgrade footballers
Hertha BSC players
AFC Ajax players
Olympiacos F.C. players
Super League Greece players
Ligue 1 players
Swiss Super League players
Austrian Football Bundesliga players
First League of Serbia and Montenegro players
Bundesliga players
Eredivisie players
Expatriate footballers in Greece
Expatriate footballers in France
Expatriate footballers in Switzerland
Expatriate footballers in Spain
Expatriate footballers in Austria
Expatriate footballers in Germany
Expatriate footballers in the Netherlands
Serbian expatriate footballers
Serbian expatriate sportspeople in Germany
Serbian expatriate sportspeople in the Netherlands
Serbian expatriate sportspeople in Greece
Serbia and Montenegro expatriate footballers
Serbia and Montenegro expatriate sportspeople in Greece
Serbia and Montenegro expatriate sportspeople in France
Serbia and Montenegro expatriate sportspeople in Switzerland
Serbia and Montenegro expatriate sportspeople in Spain
Serbia and Montenegro expatriate sportspeople in Austria
Serbia and Montenegro expatriate sportspeople in Germany
Serbia and Montenegro expatriate sportspeople in the Netherlands
2010 FIFA World Cup players